Marek Rodák (born 13 December 1996) is a Slovak professional footballer who plays as a goalkeeper for  club Fulham and the Slovakia national team.

Club career

Marek Rodák began his career in his homeland with MFK Košice before being offered a trial with Fulham in 2013. He was signed permanently by the Fulham Academy in July 2013 at the age of 16. Despite his young age, he became part of the Under-18 side and played in the 2014 Final of the FA Youth Cup against Chelsea.

A short two-month loan to Farnborough in January 2015 was followed by a progression to Fulham's Under-21 side. On 15 January 2016, he joined Welling United on loan for the remainder of the season. Rodák joined Accrington Stanley on loan from Fulham until the end of the 2016–17 season in January 2017. He made his English Football League debut on 14 January 2017 against Cheltenham Town at Whaddon Road. Rodák had a significant role in Accrington Stanley's move from the relegation zone to a comfortably mid-table position, courtesy of a 13 match unbeaten run.

Rodák made his Fulham debut in a League Cup tie against Wycombe Wanderers on 8 August 2017. Later that month Rodak joined Rotherham United on loan for the rest of the season and made his debut in a 3–2 win at home to Bury. He then re-joined the club for a further season-long loan on 25 July 2018. Returning to his home team Fulham for the 2019–20 season he was awarded with the position of First Team goalkeeper. He made 38 appearances that season as he helped them achieve promotion via the Play-offs.

Rodák made his Premier League debut on 12 September 2020 in a 0–3 loss to Arsenal in the first round of 2020–21 season. He then spent the rest of the season as a backup for Alphonse Areola and made only one additional league appearance in 0–2 loss to Newcastle United on the last day of the season.

He made his 2022-23 Premier League debut on 6 August, playing the entire 2–2 home draw against Liverpool.

International career
Rodák was called up to the Slovakia senior team in June 2018 but didn't make an appearance.

In September 2018, Rodák scored a 94th minute winner for Slovakia U21s in a crucial 2019 European Under-21 Championship qualifying game against Iceland U21s. This wasn't his first goal scored at under-21 level, having previously scored for Fulham against Aston Villa in the U21s Premier League in 2014.

On 7 September 2020, Rodák made his senior team debut in UEFA Nations League match against Israel, which ended in 1–1 draw. He went on to start in another four matches in 2020, including two Euro 2020 qualification play-off matches. He made a save in the penalty shootout against Ireland on 8 October 2020, and helped the team to secure 2–1 win  after extra time against Northern Ireland on 12 November 2020, which qualified Slovakia for Euro 2020.

Career statistics

International

Honours
Rotherham United
EFL League One play-offs: 2018

Fulham
EFL Championship: 2021–22
EFL Championship play-offs: 2020

References

External links

Fulham FC profile
Futbalnet profile 

1996 births
Living people
Sportspeople from Košice
Slovak footballers
Association football goalkeepers
Fulham F.C. players
Farnborough F.C. players
Welling United F.C. players
Accrington Stanley F.C. players
Rotherham United F.C. players
English Football League players
Premier League players
Slovakia youth international footballers
Slovakia under-21 international footballers
Slovakia international footballers
UEFA Euro 2020 players
Slovak expatriate footballers
Expatriate footballers in England
Slovak expatriate sportspeople in England